The singles discography of Australian recording artist Kylie Minogue consists of 96 singles (79 as lead artist, nine as a featured artist and seven released to raise money for charity), and 19 promotional recordings.

Minogue's music career began as a result of her popularity in Neighbours, an Australian soap opera. After an impromptu performance with the cast of the show, she signed to Mushroom Records in 1987. That same year, she released a cover of the Little Eva song "Locomotion". It spent seven weeks on top of the ARIA Singles Chart and became the highest-selling single of the 1980s in Australia. "I Should Be So Lucky", her second single, became a worldwide number one, topping the UK Singles Chart for five consecutive weeks. Later, in 1988, she signed with PWL Records for releases in the United Kingdom, and based herself there as a result. Her debut album, Kylie, produced several singles. A re-recorded version of "The Loco-Motion" saw peaks in the top ten of the charts it entered, while "Got to Be Certain" and "Je ne sais pas pourquoi" peaked in the top twenty in the majority of the charts they entered. Minogue released three additional albums with PWL. The singles "Hand on Your Heart" and "Tears on My Pillow", released from Enjoy Yourself (1989), topped the charts in the UK. Minogue took a mature turn in the 1990 release of Rhythm of Love. All singles from the album peaked within the top twenty in the United Kingdom and Australia. Her next album, 1991's Let's Get to It, also spawned singles which peaked within the top twenty in the United Kingdom and Australia. By 1992, Minogue had completed her recording contract with PWL Records. She decided not to renew it, after which a Greatest Hits was released. The album produced two top thirty singles, "What Kind of Fool (Heard All That Before)" and "Celebration". In 1993, Minogue signed with Deconstruction Records. Three singles were released from the eponymous Kylie Minogue, with "Confide in Me" topping the Australian singles chart and peaking at number two in the UK. However, none of the singles taken from Impossible Princess peaked in the top ten of any of the charts they entered. "Did It Again", the second single, was the most successful from the album, charting at 15 and 14 in Australia and the UK respectively.

After being dropped from Deconstruction due to low sales in 1998, Minogue signed with Parlophone Records in April 1999. She released "Spinning Around" in 2000, which debuted at number one in the UK. This earned Minogue a place in the Guinness Book of World Records, for the first female Australian singer to debut at number one in the UK. The album that followed, Light Years, spawned singles which achieved the top twenty in the UK and Australia. In 2001, she released the single, "Can't Get You Out of My Head", from the album Fever. It topped the charts in Australia, New Zealand, UK, and most of Europe. Another single, "Come into My World", gave Minogue her first Grammy Award in 2004 (for Best Dance Recording). In 2003, the single "Slow", from Body Language, became another number-one single in the UK. In 2004, she released another greatest hits package named Ultimate Kylie. The single "I Believe in You" reached the top five in the UK. In May 2005, after being diagnosed with breast cancer, she went on medical leave. After returning to full health, Minogue released her tenth studio album X in 2007. It produced five singles, including the Australian number one single "2 Hearts", and the top twenty single "Wow". Her eleventh studio album, Aphrodite in 2010 spawned the top-three single, "All the Lovers". In 2014, she released the singles, "Into the Blue", and "I Was Gonna Cancel" from her twelfth studio album, Kiss Me Once.

Referred as the “Princess of Pop” by various media outlets, Minogue has sold more than 80 million records worldwide. She has sold over 10.1 million singles in the United Kingdom alone, making her the 12th best-selling singles artist and the 3rd best-selling female artist in UK history. She has 10 Australian and 7 UK number-ones, along with 11 UK number-twos. In total, she has 34 UK top ten hits.

As lead artist

1980s

1990s

2000s

2010s

2020s

As featured artist

Charity singles

Promotional singles

Other charted songs

Other appearances

Songwriting credits

See also

 List of songs recorded by Kylie Minogue
 List of artists by number of UK Singles Chart number ones
 List of artists who reached number one on the U.S. dance chart
 List of number-one dance hits (United States)

Notes

References

Sources

External links

 

Discographies of Australian artists
Discography
Pop music discographies